Panorex may refer to:

 dental panoramic radiograph 
 proposed trade name of the investigational anti-cancer monoclonal antibody edrecolomab
 a cinema and cultural centre in Nová Dubnica, Slovakia